Ruedemannipterus is a genus of prehistoric eurypterid classified as part of the family Dolichopteridae. The genus contains one species, R. stylonuroides, known from the Silurian of New York.

References

Eurypteroidea
Silurian eurypterids
Silurian arthropods of North America
Eurypterids of North America